Waldemar Klingelhöfer  (4 April 1900 — 18 January 1977) was an SS-Sturmbannführer and convicted war criminal.

Early life
Klingelhöfer was born in Moscow as the son of a funeral director of German origins. Waldemar Klingelhöfer attended school in Kassel, served in the German army from June–December 1918 and after the war studied music and voice. He gave concerts throughout Germany and later received a State's Certificate as a voice teacher. In 1935, he became an opera singer.

Nazi career
In 1937, he took over the Department of Culture, a branch of the Security Service (Sicherheitsdienst, or SD), office SD III-C in Kassel. In 1941, he was assigned to Einsatzgruppe B as a Russian interpreter. This Einsatzgruppe—already by November 1941, according to its own Status Report No. 133—had killed 45,467 persons.

By 26 October, Vorkommando Moscow—a part of Einsatzgruppe B—and the group staff had executed 2,457 persons, including 572 people killed between 28 September and 26 October 1941, while Klingelhöfer was in command. Klingelhöfer witnessed executions and carried out others. For example, he shot 30 Jews who had left a ghetto without permission. Klingelhöfer later claimed he did this on the orders of Arthur Nebe to make an example out of the victims, then contradicted himself by saying that three women had contacted some partisans, then returned to the town and spoke with the Jews. This, according to Klingelhöfer, made the Jews partisans and therefore subject to being shot. The three women Klingelhöfer also shot, but—unlike the Jews—he blindfolded them and buried them in a separate grave.

War crimes trial
At trial, Klingelhöfer claimed that his only role in the Einsatzgruppe was that of interpreter. This contention was rejected by the court, on the grounds that even if it were true, as an interpreter, his tasks included locating, evaluating and forwarding to the Einsatzgruppe command lists of Communist party functionaries. Because—according to his own testimony—he knew the people would be executed when found, this made him an accessory to the crime.

Beyond this, the tribunal found that Klingelhöfer was not just an interpreter, but an active leader and commander, who knew what the Einsatz units were doing to the Jews. According to Klingelhöfer's own affidavit, he had been appointed by Arthur Nebe to lead Vorkommando Moscow:

The Einsatzgruppen operated with the assumption that a Führer order existed that provided for and required the mass murder of Jews, Gypsies and others whom the Nazis did not deem racially worthy. Although Klingelhöfer stated several times during his testimony that he was morally opposed to the Führer Order, the court found that he went along quite willingly with it. Klingelhöfer was unrepentant about the necessity for the war:

Death sentence and reprieve
On 10 April 1948, Klingelhöfer was sentenced to death in the Einsatzgruppen Trial. In 1951, under intense political pressure, U.S. High Commissioner John J. McCloy commuted Klingelhöfer's sentence—and those of three other Einsatzgruppen defendants—to life imprisonment. On 12 December 1956, Klingelhöfer was released from Landsberg Prison on parole. In 1960, he lived in Villingen and worked as an office clerk.

Notes

References
Trials of War Criminals before the Nuernberg Military Tribunals under Control Council Law No. 10, Nuernberg, October 1946 - April 1949, Volume IV, ("Green Series) (the "Einsatzgruppen case") also available at Mazel library (well indexed HTML version)
Diefenforf, Jeffry M., Frohn, Axel, and Rupieper, Hermann-Josef, American Policy and the Reconstruction of West Germany, 1945-1955, Cambridge University Press 1994

Further reading
Earl, Hilary, The Nuremberg SS-Einsatzgruppen Trial, 1945–1958: Atrocity, Law, and History, Nipissing University, Ontario 
Headland, Ronald, Messages of Murder: A Study of the Reports of the Einsatzgruppen of the Security Police and the Security Service, 1941-1943, Rutherford 1992

External links
 Biography and photo

1900 births
1977 deaths
Nazi Party officials
SS-Sturmbannführer
Holocaust perpetrators in Belarus
Holocaust perpetrators in Russia
People convicted by the United States Nuremberg Military Tribunals
German prisoners sentenced to death
Prisoners sentenced to death by the United States military
20th-century German male opera singers
Einsatzgruppen personnel
German people convicted of crimes against humanity